Chen Chuan was a 7th-century Chinese physician who, in 643, noted the symptoms of thirst and the sweetness of urine of diabetics.

References 
 A Dictionary of the History of Medicine by Anton Sebastian. Page 249. Google Book Search 

7th-century Chinese physicians
Year of death unknown
Year of birth unknown